World Cultural Festival (WCF) was held on the Yamuna floodplains in New Delhi from 11–13 March 2016. It was organised by Ravi Shankar to celebrate the Art of Living Foundation’s 35 years in service. It was reported to have been attended by 3.5 million people in audience and 37,000 artists over 3 days. The performances were held on a 100 feet tall by 1,200 feet wide stage with an area of seven acres. Initially, around 1,700 officials were deployed for traffic management for the World Cultural Festival and around 300 were on standby for the other events to be held during the same time.  Another festival by the same name was also held by this foundation at Berlin Olympic Stadium in 2011.

The 2016 event was chaired by Justice RC Lahoti. Dr. Boutros Boutros-Ghali from United Nations was also listed as a co-chair for the event but he died prior to the event. Some other committee members included former Dutch Prime Minister Ruud Lubbers; Nancy Pelosi, Katherine Clark and Ed Witfield from United States Congress; and former Lithuanian president Vytautas Landsbergis. It was attended by various global and local religious and political leaders. Participants included former French Prime Minister Dominique de Villepin, Nepalese Deputy Prime Minister Kamal Thapa, Vice-President of Suriname Ashwin Adhin and Karu Jayasuriya from the Sri Lankan Parliament. Indian Prime Minister Narendra Modi was also in audience and compared the festival to a “kumbh mela” of art. Other Indian leaders including Rajnath Singh, Sushma Swaraj, Shivraj Singh Chouhan, Devendra Fadnavis, Raman Singh and Manish Sisodia attended the event on 12 March 2016. The last day of the event was attended by many BJP leaders including Arun Jaitley, Ravi Shankar Prasad, Venkaiah Naidu, Lok Sabha Speaker Sumitra Mahajan and Delhi Chief Minister Arvind Kejriwal.

The event was also promoted as an interfaith meet and attended by religious leaders like Rev. Dr. Gerald L. Durley, Dr. Ahmad Badreddin Hassoun, Mufti Mohammed Saeed Khan, Shankaracharya Vasudevanand Saraswati among others.

The festival was highly criticized in the Indian news media for environmental reasons. The Art of Living Foundation questioned the findings by the tribunal and has since then submitted a plea in the Supreme Court of India. President Pranab Mukherjee declined to attend the event after first accepting the invitation due to concerns about environment law violations. Zimbabwe President Robert Mugabe also pulled out of the event citing security and protocol issues. A separate enclosure had to be constructed for Narendra Modi also due to a security threat.

Australian Prime Minister Malcolm Turnbull invited Art of Living Foundation to Australia for the next World Culture Festival.

External links 
 Event Website

References

Festivals in Delhi
2016 in India